Big Thing is a 2010 South Korean television drama based on manhwa artist Park In-kwon's comic Daemul, and stars Go Hyun-jung as South Korea's first female president. Number one in its timeslot for 11 consecutive weeks, it gained successful ratings due to its cast and story arcs based on topical and controversial themes.

Plot
Anchorwoman Seo Hye-rim (Go Hyun-jung), who gets fired while protesting about her husband's undeserved death, enters politics through the proposal of Kang Tae-san (Cha In-pyo), a member of the ruling party and a strong candidate for the next presidential elections. With the help of Ha Do-ya (Kwon Sang-woo) whom she's known since childhood, Seo becomes the first female president of South Korea. With political pressure and threats of potential impeachment from her rival Kang and his allies, Seo faces the crises and challenges of her term.

Cast
Go Hyun-jung as Seo Hye-rim 
Kwon Sang-woo as Ha Do-ya 
Cha In-pyo as Kang Tae-san 
Lee Soo-kyung as Jang Se-jin 
Park Geun-hyung as Jo Bae-ho (president of Democratic Party)
Lee Soon-jae as Baek Sung-min (former President)
Choi Il-hwa as Kim Myung-hwan (Tae-san's father-in-law)
Lee Jae-yong as Gong Sung-jo (Do-ya's boss)
Ahn Suk-hwan as Son Bon-Shik (media director)
Im Hyun-sik as Ha Bong-do (Do-ya's father)
Lee Joo-Shil as Yoon Myung-Ja (Hye-rim's mother)
Kim Jae-bin as Park Dong-Hwa (Hye-rim's son)
Seo Ji-young as Kim Ji-soo (Tae-san's wife, Myung-hwan's daughter)
Song Ok-sook as Madam Min – Min Kyung-woo (friend of Se-jin's mother)
Jang Young-nam as Wang Joong-ki (electoral specialist)
Park Ji-il as Chief of Staff
Kim Il-woo as Oh Jae-bong (Bae-ho's subordinate)
Yum Dong-Hyun as Seo Soon-Jae
Lee Moon-soo as Kim Tae-bong (corrupt senator)
Kim Jin-ho as Kim Hyun-gab (Tae-bong's subordinate)
Shin Seung-hwan as Kim Chul-Gyu (Kim Tae-bong's son)
Yoon Joo-sang as Min Dong-ho (president of the adversary party)
Goo Ji-sung as Park Myung-young (Do-ya's secretary)
Kim Joon-ho as Hwang Jae-man (killer)
Kim Tae-woo as Park Min-goo (Hye-rim's late husband) (cameo, ep 1)
Im Dong-Yub as vice manager (cameo)
Rainbow as girlband (cameo, ep 5)
Oh Seung-ah as Mina

Ratings
 In the table below, the blue numbers represent the lowest ratings and the red numbers represent the highest ratings.

Source: TNS Media Korea

Awards and nominations

References

External links
 Daemul official SBS website 
 
 

Seoul Broadcasting System television dramas
2010 South Korean television series debuts
2010 South Korean television series endings
Korean-language television shows
Television shows based on manhwa
South Korean political television series
Television series by Victory Contents